Anna Steese Richardson (April 5, 1865May 10, 1949) was an American writer and editor.

Anna Steese Richardson was born on April 5, 1865, in Massillon, Ohio. She began her career as a newspaper reporter in Council Bluffs, Iowa, and worked at several other papers before joining the Woman's Home Companion. She came to New York City about 1921. As of 1938, when she gave a commencement speech at Hunter College, she was an associate editor of the Companion. She died on May 10, 1949, at 903 Park Avenue, Manhattan, New York.

Publications 
 Miss Mosher of Colorado; or, A Mountain Psyche (play, 1899)
 Adventures in Thrift (1916)
 Standard Etiquette (1923)
 Etiquette at a Glance (1927)

In popular culture
In the 1927 silent crime-drama film Chicago, a minor character, Charleston Lou, was in one scene reading a passage of Richardson's Standard Etiquette.

References 

1865 births
1949 deaths
19th-century American women writers
20th-century American journalists
20th-century American women writers
American editors
People from Massillon, Ohio